C. arabica  may refer to:
 Coffea arabica, a plant species originally indigenous to Yemen in the Arabian Peninsula and from the southwestern highlands of Ethiopia and southeastern Sudan
 Crocidura arabica, the Arabian shrew, a mammal species found in Oman and Yemen
 Cypraea arabica, the Arabian cowry, a sea snail species

See also
 Arabica (disambiguation)